Tunicatimonas pelagia is a Gram-negative, strictly aerobic, rod-shaped and non-motile bacterium from the genus Tunicatimonas which has been isolated from a sea anemone.

References

Cytophagia
Bacteria described in 2015